The Australian Council For International Development (ACFID) is an independent national association of Australian non-government organisations (NGOs) working in the field of international aid and development. ACFID was founded in 1965, with Syd Einfeld as Chairman, and has over 130 members working in 90 developing countries and supported by over 1.5 million Australians.  It lobbies for non-government aid organisations, and Australian government development aid.

ACFID was formerly known as ACFOA (The Australian Council For Overseas Aid).  ACFID is based in Canberra, Australia.

The ACFID Code of Conduct is a voluntary, self-regulatory industry Code for international development organisations.  Launched in 1998 by Governor General Sir William Deane, it represents a commitment by its signatories to high standards of integrity and accountability.

The ACFID Code of Conduct defines the standards of best practice for international development organisations in the fields of organisational integrity, governance, communication with the public, finances and personnel and management practices.

Vision

To promote conditions of sustainable human development in which people are able to enjoy a full range of human rights, fulfill their needs free from poverty, and live in dignity.

ACFID Members

The following organisations were listed as full ACFID members as of December 2012.
 
 40K Foundation Australia
 ACC International Relief
 Act for Peace - NCCA
 ActionAid Australia
 ADRA Australia
 Afghan Australian Development Organisation
 Anglican Board of Mission - Australia
 Anglican Overseas Aid
 Archbishop of Sydney's Overseas Relief and Aid Fund
 Assisi Aid Projects
 Australasian Society for HIV Medicine
 Australian Cranio-Maxillo Facial Foundation
 Australia for UNHCR
 Access Aid International
 Australian Business Volunteers
 Australian Conservation Foundation
 Australian Doctors International
 Australian Doctors for Africa
 Australian Federation of AIDS Organisations
 Australian Foundation for the Peoples of Asia and the Pacific
 Australian Himalayan Foundation
 Australian Hope International Inc.
 Australian Injecting and Illicit Drug Users League*
 Australian Lutheran World Service
 Australian Marist Solidarity Ltd
 Australian Medical Aid Foundation
 Australian Respiratory Council
 Australian Volunteers International
 Baptist World Aid Australia
 Brien Holden Vision Institute Foundation
 Burnet Institute
 Business for Millennium Development
 CARE Australia
 Caritas Australia
 CBM Australia
 Charities Aid Foundation
 ChildFund Australia
 CLAN (Caring and Living as Neighbours)
 Cufa
 Daughters of Our Lady of the Sacred Heart Overseas Aid Fund*
 Door of Hope Australia Inc.
 Emergency Architects Australia
 Engineers without Borders
 Family Planning New South Wales
 Foresight (Overseas Aid and Prevention of Blindness)
 The Fred Hollows Foundation
 Friends of the Earth Australia
 Global Development Group
 GraceWorks Myanmar
 Habitat for Humanity Australia
 HealthServe Australia
 Hunger Project Australia, The
 International Detention Coalition*
 International Needs Australia
 International Nepal Fellowship (Aust) Ltd
 International RiverFoundation*
 International Women's Development Agency
 Interplast Australia & New Zealand
 Islamic Relief Australia
 John Fawcett Foundation
 Kyeema Foundation
 Lasallian Foundation
 Leprosy Mission Australia, The
 Lifestyle Solutions (Aust) Ltd
 Live & Learn Environmental Education
 Mahboba’s Promise Australia
 Marie Stopes International Australia
 Mercy Works Inc.
 Mission World Aid Inc.
 Motivation Australia
 Nusa Tenggara Association Inc.
 Oaktree
 Opportunity International Australia
 Oro Community Development Project Inc.
 Oxfam Australia
 Partners in Aid
 PLAN International Australia
 Project Vietnam
 Quaker Service Australia
 RedR Australia
 RESULTS International (Australia)
 Salesian Society Incorporated
 Salvation Army (NSW Property Trust)
 Save the Children Australia
 SeeBeyondBorders
 Sexual Health & Family Planning Australia
 SIMaid
 TEAR Australia
 Transparency International Australia
 Union Aid Abroad-APHEDA
 UnitingWorld
 University of Cape Town Australian Trust
 WaterAid Australia
 World Education Australia
 World Vision Australia
 WWF-Australia

References

External links
 http://www.acfid.asn.au
 http://www.acfid.asn.au/code-of-conduct

Development charities based in Australia